is an interchange station on the Odakyu Odawara and the Keio Inokashira lines located in Kitazawa, Setagaya, Tokyo, and jointly operated by the private railway operators Odakyu Electric Railway and Keio Corporation.

The station gives its name to the surrounding Shimokitazawa neighborhood in the southern corner of the Kitazawa district, which is a popular area for young people in large numbers. It includes small independently owned shops, cafes, live music venues and theaters.

Lines

Service pattern
On the Keio Inokashira Line, both all-stations "Local" services and limited-stop "Express" services stop at this station. On the Odakyu Odawara Line, only Limited Express services pass the station.

Station layout
The Odakyu Odawara and Keio Inokashira lines cross at this station, with the Keio line on elevated tracks above the Odakyu line. After a major station reconstruction project, the Odakyu lines were relocated in March 2013 from their prior surface position to new platforms three stories underground. Additional construction work, ending in 2018, separated the express line trains from the local line trains, one level above.

An unusual feature of Shimo-kitazawa Station for many years was the use of a single ticket gate serving two independent lines and ticketing systems; this was a legacy of the Inokashira Line's former ownership by Odakyu. Additionally, there were no ticket gates between the two lines.   However, as part of a major Station renovation construction project, this was changed in March 2019.  Now, both lines have separate entrances and ticket gates, and it is necessary to exit and enter ticket gates in order to switch between lines.

Odakyu platforms
The Odakyu station consists of two underground island platforms located on the first and second basement levels, serving two tracks each.

Basement 2F: express, commuter express, and rapid express

Basement 1F: local, semi-express, express, and commuter semi-express

Keio platforms
The Keio station consists of an elevated island platform serving two tracks.

History
The Odakyu section was opened on 1 April 1927, and the Keio section on 1 August 1933.

From 22 February 2013, station numbering was introduced on Keio lines, with Shimo-kitazawa being assigned station number IN05.

From 23 March 2013, trains used the new underground platforms located on the third basement (B3F) level, and the original ground-level platforms were taken out of service. As of 3 March 2018, platforms on the second basement (B2F) level have opened for use by all-stations services, with the lower platforms used by limited-stop services only.

Station numbering was introduced to the Odakyu platforms in 2014 with Shimo-kitazawa being assigned station number OH07.

Passenger statistics
In fiscal 2011, the Keio station was used by an average of 127,124 passengers daily. The passenger figures for previous years are as shown below.

Surrounding area

 Setagaya Ward Office

See also
 List of railway stations in Japan

References

External links

 Shimo-kitazawa Station information (Keio) 
 Shimo-kitazawa Station information (Odakyu) 

Railway stations in Japan opened in 1927
Odakyu Odawara Line
Stations of Odakyu Electric Railway
Keio Inokashira Line
Stations of Keio Corporation
Railway stations in Tokyo